Israel Fernando da Costa Alves (born 31 January 1977), is a Portuguese professional futsal player who plays as a winger for Futsal Azeméis. Israel earned over 100 caps for the Portugal national team and competed in two FIFA Futsal World Cups, in 2004 and 2008, and in three UEFA Futsal Championships, in 2005, 2007, and 2010.
At club level in his long career as a futsal player he became Portuguese champion playing for Sporting CP in the 2003–04 season and he also played in the Spanish División de Honor de Futsal for FS Zamora and in China for Zhuhai Ming Shi.

References

External links

1977 births
Living people
Sportspeople from Porto
Portuguese men's futsal players
AR Freixieiro players
Sporting CP futsal players
C.F. Os Belenenses futsal players